Minister of Environment may refer to:

 Minister of Environment (Finland)
 Minister of Environment (Manitoba)
 Minister of Environment (Sri Lanka)